Andres-Allan Ellmann (born Andres-Allan Kurvits, better known by his pseudonym Andres Allan;  24 September 1965 – 22 July 1988) was an Estonian poet.

Life
Andres Allan was born in Tallinn. He was the younger brother of artist . He attended primary school at Tallinn Secondary School No. 7 (now, Tallinn English College) and secondary school at Tallinn Secondary School No. 2 (now, Tallinn Secondary School of Science), graduating in 1983. After secondary school, he studied at the Institute of Theology of the Estonian Evangelical Lutheran Church.
  
Andres Allan wrote poetry with a mystical-religious connotation. His poems were been published in the newspaper Edasi and in the magazines Vikerkaar, Kultuur ja Elu, Looming, Marm, and Noorus.

He died after a fall from balcony in Tallinn in 1988, aged 22. It is uncertain whether the fall was a suicide or an accident. He was buried in Pärnamäe Cemetery in Tallinn.

Books

Poetry
 Urjamised (1992)
 Öötrükid, edited by Lauri Sommer (2009)

References

External links
 Andres Allan at Estonian Writers' Online Dictionary

1965 births
1988 deaths
Estonian male poets
20th-century Estonian poets
Writers from Tallinn
Burials at Pärnamäe Cemetery
Deaths from falls